The 9th NKP Salve Challenger Trophy was an Indian domestic cricket tournament that was held in Bangalore from 10 September to 13 September 2003. The series involved the domestic and national players from India, who were allocated in India Seniors, India A, and India B. India A defeated India B by 99 runs in the final to become the champions of the tournament.

Squads

Points Table

Matches

Group stage

Final

References

Indian domestic cricket competitions